Noorda unipunctalis is a moth in the family Crambidae. It was described by Hans Georg Amsel in 1963. It is found in Ethiopia.

References

Moths described in 1963
Crambidae